David Zen Mansley is an American theatrical and voice actor. He is best known for voicing of Agent/President John Bishop in the 2003 cartoon series Teenage Mutant Ninja Turtles. Mansley has also provided the voices for several other cartoon characters on TMNT such as Rat King, Darius Dun, Zog, Savanti Romero and Triple Threat. He has also provided the voice for Professor Armand Aniskov on the cartoon series Speed Racer: The Next Generation, Nefertari Nebra on the 4Kids version of One Piece and Lord Van Bloot on Chaotic.

Filmography
Chaotic (TV series) – Lord Van Bloot
Giant Robo: The Animation – Q Boss (ep. 1), Professor Simule (NYAV Post Dub)
One Piece – Nefertari Nebra (4Kids version)
Speed Racer: The Next Generation – Professor Armand Aniskov, Stan Gibbon
Teenage Mutant Ninja Turtles (2003) – John Bishop, Savanti Romero, Rat King, Mr. Sun, Darius Dun, Kon Shisho
Yu-Gi-Oh! Zexal II – Abyss

Theater
In addition to voice work, Mansley works off-broadway as an actor, director, set-designer, and script writer.

References

External links
 
 
 

Year of birth missing (living people)
Living people
American male voice actors
American directors
American producers